Pak Beng is a district (muang) of Oudomxay province in northwestern Laos.

Pak Beng Dam
Seven kilometres upstream of Pak Beng is where the proposed Pak Beng Dam is to be sited. The 912 megawatt project is the northernmost of a proposed 11 dams on the lower Mekong River. Ninety percent of the electricity generated is to be sold to Thailand. The remaining 10 percent will go to the Lao state-owned utility company, Electricite du Laos.

References

Districts of Oudomxay province